Blake Ellis (born 6 January 1999) is an Australian tennis player.

Ellis won the 2016 Australian Open boys' doubles alongside Alex De Minaur.

Career

2014 – 2017: Senior Beginnings
Ellis made his senior debut in October 2014 at the Australia F7, where he lost in round 1. Between 2015 and 2017, Ellis competed in the ITF Men's Circuit around Australia, Asia, and Europe, with his best result in that time period being a semi-final appearance in the August 2017 Thailand F6 Futures tournament in Nonthaburi.

In October 2017, Ellis won his first Challenger match against Austrian Lucas Mielder in the Canberra International.

2018
At the 2018 Shimadzu All Japan Indoor Tennis Championships, Ellis had his best Challenger-level performance to date, winning his qualifying matches and then defeating two previous tournament champions in 5th seed Tatsuma Ito and 3rd seed Go Soeda en route to a semi-final loss against fellow Australian and eventual champion John Millman.

2021
In October 2021, Ellis won his fifth ITF doubles title and third for the season.

ITF Circuit finals

Singles: 0

Doubles: 17 (8 titles, 9 runners-up)

Junior Grand Slam finals

Doubles: 1 (1 title)

References

External links
 
 
 

1999 births
Living people
Australian male tennis players
Tennis players from Brisbane
Australian Open (tennis) junior champions
Grand Slam (tennis) champions in boys' doubles
20th-century Australian people
21st-century Australian people